Liebenberg is a surname, and may refer to:

 Adolf von Liebenberg, Austrian scientist
 Andreas Liebenberg (1938–1998), South African military officer
 Anrune Liebenberg, South African para-athlete
 Brian Liebenberg, South African-born French rugby player
 Chris Liebenberg, South African banker
 Frederik Ludvig Liebenberg (1810–1894), Danish writer and publisher
 Gerhardus Liebenberg, South African cricket player
 Hanro Liebenberg, South African rugby player
 Hercú Liebenberg, South African rugby player
 Karl Liebenberg, South African cricket umpire
 Lauren Liebenberg, Zimbabwean writer
 Lee-Anne Liebenberg, South African model
 Petrus Johannes Liebenberg (1857–1950), Boer war general
 Riaan Liebenberg, South African paralympic athlete
 RJ Liebenberg, South African rugby player
 Tiaan Liebenberg, South African rugby player
 Wiaan Liebenberg, South African rugby player

See also
 Liebenberg and Kaplan, an American architectural firm (1920s–1950s)
 Liebenberg syndrome, a rare autosomal genetic disease
 Liebenberg v The Master, a South African succession law case

Surnames
Afrikaans-language surnames
Surnames of German origin